Razeh castle is a historical castle located in Andimeshk County in Khuzestan Province, The longevity of this fortress dates back to the Safavid dynasty.

References 

Castles in Iran